Camrose may refer to:
People
Viscount Camrose

Locations
Camrose, Alberta, Canada
Camrose, Pembrokeshire, Wales

See also
Camrose Trophy, awarded in contract bridge